The Groom of the Stool (formally styled: "Groom of the King's Close Stool") was the most intimate of an English monarch's courtiers, responsible for assisting the king in excretion and hygiene.

The physical intimacy of the role naturally led to his becoming a man in whom much confidence was placed by his royal master and with whom many royal secrets were shared as a matter of course. This secret information—while it would never have been revealed, for it would have led to the discredit of his honour—in turn led to his becoming feared and respected and therefore powerful within the royal court in his own right. The office developed gradually over decades and centuries into one of administration of the royal finances, and under Henry VII, the Groom of the Stool became a powerful official involved in setting national fiscal policy, under the "chamber system".

Later, the office was renamed Groom of the Stole. The Tudor historian David Starkey classes this change as classic Victorianism: "When the Victorians came to look at this office, they spelt it s-t-o-l-e, and imagined all kinds of fictions about elaborate robes draped around the neck of the monarch at the coronation"; however, the change is in fact seen as early as the 17th century.

History

Origins
The Groom of the Stool was a male servant in the household of the English monarch who was responsible for assisting the king in his toileting needs. It is a matter of some debate as to whether the duties involved cleaning the king's anus, but the groom is known to have been responsible for supplying a bowl, water and towels and also for monitoring the king's diet and bowel movements and liaising with the Royal Doctor about the king's health. The appellation "Groom of the Close Stool" derived from the item of furniture used as a toilet. It also appears as "Grom of the Stole" as the word "Groom" comes from the Old Low Franconian word "Grom".

In the Tudor era
By the Tudor age, the role of Groom of the Stool was fulfilled by a substantial figure, such as Hugh Denys (d. 1511) who was a member of the Gloucestershire gentry, married to an aristocratic wife, and who died possessing at least four manors. The function was transformed into that of a virtual minister of the royal treasury, being then an essential figure in the king's management of fiscal policy.

In the early years of Henry VIII's reign, the title was awarded to court companions of the king who spent time with him in the privy chamber. These were generally the sons of noblemen or important members of the gentry. In time they came to act as virtual personal secretaries to the king, carrying out a variety of administrative tasks within his private rooms. The position was an especially prized one, as it allowed unobstructed access to the king. David Starkey writes: "The Groom of the Stool had (to our eyes) the most menial tasks; his standing, though, was the highest ... Clearly then, the royal body service must have been seen as entirely honourable, without a trace of the demeaning or the humiliating." Further, "the mere word of the Gentleman of the Privy Chamber was sufficient evidence in itself of the king's will", and the Groom of the Stool bore "the indefinable charisma of the monarchy".

Evolution and discontinuation
The office was exclusively one serving male monarchs, so on the accession of Elizabeth I of England in 1558, it was replaced by the First Lady of the Bedchamber, first held by Kat Ashley. The office effectively came to an end when it was "neutralised" in 1559.

In Scotland the valets of the chamber like John Gibb had an equivalent role. On the accession of James I, the male office was revived as the senior Gentleman of the Bedchamber, who always was a great nobleman who had considerable power because of its intimate access to the king. During the reign of Charles I, the term "stool" appears to have lost its original signification of chair. From 1660 the office of Groom of the Stole (revived with the Restoration of the Monarchy) was invariably coupled with that of First Gentleman (or Lady) of the Bedchamber; as effective Head of the royal Bedchamber, the Groom of the Stole was a powerful individual who had the right to attend the monarch at all times and to regulate access to his or her private quarters. Incongruously, the office of Groom of the Stole continued in use during the reign of Queen Anne, when it was held by a duchess who combined its duties with those of Mistress of the Robes.

Under the Hanoverians the 'Groom of the Stole' began to be named in The London Gazette. In 1726, John Chamberlayne wrote that while the Lord Chamberlain has oversight of all Officers belonging to the King's Chamber, 'the Precinct of the King's Bed-Chamber […] is wholly under the Groom of the Stole'. Chamberlayne defines the Groom of the Stole as the first of the Gentlemen of the Bedchamber; translating his title ('from the Greek') as 'Groom or Servant of the Long-robe or Vestment', he explains that he has 'the Office and Honour to present and put on his Majesty's first Garment or Shirt every morning, and to order the Things of the Bed-Chamber'. By 1740 the Groom of the Stole is described as having 'the care of the king's wardrobe'.

The office again fell into abeyance with the accession of Queen Victoria, though her husband, Prince Albert, and their son, Edward, Prince of Wales, employed similar courtiers; but when Edward acceded to the throne as King Edward VII in 1901, he discontinued the office.

List of Grooms of the Stool

Before the Tudors
William Grymesby is mentioned as Yoman of the Stoole in 1455, in A collection of ordinances and regulations for the government of the royal household, printed in 1790 (cited OED). This may, or may not, be the Willielmus Grymesby who was MP for Great Grimsby.

Tudor monarchy

Grooms of the Stool under Henry VII
Sir Edward Burton (d. 23 Apr 1524) of Longnor, Shropshire, father of Sir John Burton, Groom of the Stool to King Henry VIII.
 
1485-1487:Lambert Simnel 
1487-1509: Hugh Denys of Osterley, Middlesex. Hugh Denys controlled the private and secret finances of King Henry VII.

Grooms of the Stool under Henry VIII (1509–1547)
1509–1526: Sir William Compton
1526–1536: Sir Henry Norris
1536–1546: Sir Thomas Heneage
1546–1547: Sir Anthony Denny
Heneage and Denny, as servants "whom he used secretly about him", were privy to Henry VIII's most intimate confidences about Anne of Cleves. He told them he doubted her virginity, on account of "her brests so slacke".

Grooms of the Stool to Edward VI (1547–1553)
1547–1551: Sir Michael Stanhope

Neither Mary I nor Elizabeth I appointed a Groom of the Stool.

Stuart monarchy

Grooms of the Stool to James I (1603–1625)
1603-1625: Thomas Erskine, 1st Earl of Kellie.

Grooms of the Stool to Charles I (1625–1649)
1625–1631: Sir James Fullerton
1636–1643: Henry Rich, 1st Earl of Holland
1643–c.1649: William Seymour, 1st Marquess of Hertford
c.1649: Thomas Blagge

Grooms of the Stool to Henrietta Maria of France
1660–c.1667/1673: Elizabeth Boyle, Countess of Guilford

Grooms of the Stole to Charles II (1660–1685)
1660: William Seymour, 1st Marquess of Hertford
1660–1685: Sir John Granville (later Earl of Bath)

Grooms of the Stole to James II (1685–1688)
1685–1688: Henry Mordaunt, 2nd Earl of Peterborough

Grooms of the Stole to William III (1689–1702)
1689–1700: William Bentinck, 1st Earl of Portland
1700–1702: Henry Sydney, 1st Earl of Romney

Grooms of the Stole to Anne (1702–1714)
1702–1711: Sarah Churchill, Countess of Marlborough (later Duchess of Marlborough)
1711–1714: Elizabeth Seymour, Duchess of Somerset

Grooms of the Stole to Prince George
1683–1685: John Berkeley, 3rd Baron Berkeley of Stratton
1685–1687: Robert Leke, 3rd Earl of Scarsdale
1697–1708: John West, 6th Baron De La Warr

Hanoverian monarchy

Grooms of the Stole to George I
1714–1719: Lionel Sackville, 1st Duke of Dorset
1719–1722: Charles Spencer, 3rd Earl of Sunderland
1722–1723: Vacant
1723–1727: Francis Godolphin, 2nd Earl of Godolphin

Grooms of the Stole to George II
1727–1735: Francis Godolphin, 2nd Earl of Godolphin
1735–1750: Henry Herbert, 9th Earl of Pembroke
1751–1755: Willem Anne van Keppel, 2nd Earl of Albemarle
1755–1760: William Nassau de Zuylestein, 4th Earl of Rochford

Grooms of the Stole to George III
1760–1761: John Stuart, 3rd Earl of Bute
1761–1770: Francis Hastings, 10th Earl of Huntingdon
1770–1775: George Hervey, 2nd Earl of Bristol
1775: Thomas Thynne, 3rd Viscount Weymouth
1775–1782: John Ashburnham, 2nd Earl of Ashburnham
1782–1796: Thomas Thynne, 3rd Viscount Weymouth (later Marquess of Bath)
1796–1804: John Ker, 3rd Duke of Roxburghe
1804–1812: George Finch, 9th Earl of Winchilsea
1812–1820: Charles Paulet, 13th Marquess of Winchester

Grooms of the Stole to George IV
1820–1830: Charles Paulet, 13th Marquess of Winchester

Grooms of the Stole to William IV
1830–1837: Charles Paulet, 13th Marquess of Winchester

Victoria did not appoint a Groom of the Stole; appointments were made, however, in the households of her husband and eldest son.

Grooms of the Stole to Prince Albert
1840–1841: Lord Robert Grosvenor (later Lord Ebury)
1841–1846: Brownlow Cecil, 2nd Marquess of Exeter
1846–1859: James Hamilton, 2nd Marquess of Abercorn (later Duke of Abercorn)
1859–1861: John Spencer, 5th Earl Spencer

Grooms of the Stole to Albert Edward, Prince of Wales
1862–1866: John Spencer, 5th Earl Spencer
1866–1877: Vacant?
1877–1883: Sir William Knollys
1883–1901: James Hamilton, 2nd Duke of Abercorn

See also
Groom of the Robes
Valet de chambre
:ja:公人朝夕人 – the case in Japan

References

Gendered occupations
Obsolete occupations
Positions within the British Royal Household